The Xincheng Incident is an event that took place in 1896 in the city of Xincheng, Karenkō Prefecture, Taiwan, Empire of Japan. The chief of the Truku tribe, Holok Naowi, led 20 aboriginal warriors against the Japanese forces, killing 13 Japanese soldiers.

Background and causes
Since the Japanese empire took over Taiwan in 1895, there had been a growing tension between the local aboriginal tribes trying to protect their villages and hunting grounds and the Japanese forces which aimed to take over control of aboriginals lands in order to exploit natural resources.

The Xincheng event was mostly caused by sexual abuses of aboriginal women by Japanese soldiers.

Consequences
After the incident the Japanese forces launched a series of retaliatory attacks on the Truku, taking advantage of their terrain knowledge manage to resist hiding in the mountain villages.
The Japanese were forced to withdraw and offered amnesty to the aboriginal who surrendered.

After different conflicts the Truku War ended in 1914 with the victory of the Japanese over the Truku people.

See also
 History of Taiwan
 Taiwan under Japanese rule
 Taiwanese indigenous peoples

References

Conflicts in 1896
History of Taiwan
Hualien County